The Australian Swim Team known as The Dolphins, has performed successfully at major international championships. The Australian Swim Team was first referred to as The Dolphins  in 1989.  Australian Swim Team's  historical rival is the United States Swimming Team.

In 2015, there were thirty six Australian swimmers inducted into the International Swimming Hall of Fame.  These swimmers include: Dawn Fraser, Ian Thorpe, Grant Hackett, Kieren Perkins, Murray Rose and Shane Gould. Since 1990, Swimming Australia has an annual award for the Australian Swimmer of the Year.

Olympic Games

Notes - Open water included from 2008.

FINA Long Course World Championships

Pool Results

Open Water Results

FINA Short Course World Championships

Commonwealth Games

Pan Pacific Championships

Notes - includes Open water since 2006.

FINA World Junior Swimming Championships

Australia did not send a team to the 2006 nor the 2022 Championships.

Paralympic Games

World Para Swimming Championships
World Para Swimming Championships, known before 30 November 2016 as the IPC Swimming World Championships.

See also

Swimming Australia
Australian Paralympic Swim Team

References

External links
Australian Swim Team History

Australian swim teams
National sports teams of Australia